Uska or USKA can have several meanings:

In organisations:
 Union Schweizerischer Kurzwellen-Amateure
 The United States Karate Association established by Robert Trias in 1948.

In geography:
 Uska, Uttar Pradesh, India